Åtorp is a locality situated in Degerfors Municipality, Örebro County, Sweden with 212 inhabitants in 2010. The river that runs along Åtorp is called Letälven.

References 

Populated places in Örebro County
Populated places in Degerfors Municipality